Robert Caha (born 11 March 1976 in Jihlava) is a Czech football defender.

Career

Club
Caha started his career at Czech club Baník Ostrava. In 2001, he moved to Chinese Super League team Shenyang Ginde.  After one season at Shenyang Ginde, Caha moved back to Baník Ostrava and in 2003 signed for SK Sigma Olomouc.

After impressing at Sigma Olomouc, he was transferred to Bulgarian champions CSKA Sofia.

After a somewhat disappointing stay at CSKA Sofia (Caha left the club in the summer of 2005) he caught the eye of Iranian giants Persepolis F.C. and signed an 18-month contract with the club in 2005.

In February 2011, he moved to Odra Wodzisław.

References

External links
 Robert Caha's profile at SK Sigma Olomouc official site 
 
 
 

1976 births
Living people
Czech footballers
Association football defenders
Czech First League players
FC Baník Ostrava players
SK Sigma Olomouc players
FC Vysočina Jihlava players
1. SC Znojmo players
Shahin Bushehr F.C. players
Persepolis F.C. players
Expatriate footballers in Iran
Czech expatriate sportspeople in Iran
First Professional Football League (Bulgaria) players
PFC CSKA Sofia players
Slovak Super Liga players
FC DAC 1904 Dunajská Streda players
Expatriate footballers in Slovakia
Czech expatriate sportspeople in Slovakia
Czech expatriate sportspeople in China
Expatriate footballers in China
Changsha Ginde players
Expatriate footballers in Bulgaria
Czech expatriate sportspeople in Bulgaria
Odra Wodzisław Śląski players
Czech expatriate sportspeople in Poland
Sportspeople from Jihlava
Expatriate footballers in Poland